The palm is an obsolete anthropic unit of length, originally based on the width of the human palm and then variously standardized. The same name is also used for a second, rather larger unit based on the length of the human hand.

The width of the palm was a traditional unit in Ancient Egypt, Israel, Greece, and Rome and in medieval England, where it was also known as the hand, handbreadth, or handsbreadth.

The length of the hand—originally the Roman "greater palm"—formed the palm of medieval Italy and France.

History

Ancient Egypt

The unit is attested as early as the reign of Djer, third pharaoh of the First Dynasty, and appears on many surviving cubit-rods. 

Ancient Israel

Ancient Greece 

These various palms were divided into four digits (dáktylos) or two "middle phalanges" (kóndylos). Two palms made a half-foot (hēmipódion or dikhás); three, a span (spithamḗ); four, a foot (poûs); five, a short cubit (pygōn); and six, a cubit (pē̂khys).

The Greeks also had a less common "greater palm" of five digits.

Ancient Rome 

The Roman palm or lesser palm made up ¼ of the Roman foot, which varied in practice between  but is thought to have been officially . This would have given the palm a notional value of  within a range of a few millimeters.

Continental Europe

The palms of medieval and early modern Europe—the Italian, Spanish, and Portuguese  and French —were based upon the Roman "greater palm", reckoned as a hand's span or length.

In Italy, the palm varied regionally.

Palaiseau gave metric equivalents for the palme or palmo in 1816, and Rose provided English equivalents in 1900:

England

The English palm, handbreadth, or handsbreadth is three inches (7.62cm) or, equivalently, four digits. The measurement was, however, not always well distinguished from the hand or handful, which became equal to four inches by a 1541 statute of Henry VIII. The palm was excluded from the British Weights and Measures Act of 1824 that established the imperial system and is not a standard US customary unit.

Elsewhere

Notes

References 

Units of length
Human-based units of measurement
Obsolete units of measurement